Narkeldanga High School, India, is one of the oldest schools in Kolkata. Shree Rakhal Chandra Ghosh, a man noted for his social work during the Bengali Renaissance, started the school in his house in 1862. Later it was primarily owing to the efforts of Sir Gurudas Bandyopadhyay, the first Indian Vice-Chancellor of Calcutta University, that Narikeldanga High School became an institution of secondary standard.

Eminent Alumni

Jahor Roy, the famous comedian of Bengali cinema

Dr. Saroj Ghosh, recipient of the Padmabhushan Award, third in the Matriculation examination in 1950, has retired from being Director General of the National Council of Science Museum (Science City), was instrumental in development of a large chain of interactive science centres throughout India.

Dr. Ramatosh Sarkar,a revered scientist and his fundamental research in astrophysics drew accolades internationally

Dr. Bhabatosh Chattopadhyay, an eminent professor of English, went on to become the vice-chancellor of Rabindra Bharati University.

Bhagabati Prasad Bandyopaghyay, another brilliant student of this institution, Justice Bandyopadhyay was one of the eminent judges of Calcutta High Court. 

Prasanta Chatterjee, former Mayor of Kolkata and Member of Parliament (Rajya Sabha)

Sekhar Basu, eminent short story writer

See also
Education in India
List of schools in India
Education in West Bengal

References

External links
Official website of Narikeldanga High School

High schools and secondary schools in Kolkata
Educational institutions established in 1862
1862 establishments in India